SKK (Women's Basketball Section) Polonia Warsaw - is a Polish professional women's basketball club based in Warsaw, currently playing in the basketball premier league - Basket Liga Kobiet.

History
The female sports games section of the Polonia Warsaw club was established in 1925. The first discipline of the section was hazena, and soon the players also started playing basketball and volleyball (usually practicing several sports at the same time).

In the 1930s, Polonia's women basketball players were among the country's top players - they won two Polish championship titles (1934, 1935), twice won the Winter Cup of the Polish Sports Games Association (1934, 1935 - a tournament equivalent to today's Polish Cup), twice won the national vice-championship (1933, 1937) and once took third place (1939).

After World War II, the women's basketball section was revived in mid-1948, and the very next year the basketball players won the Polish vice-championship. In the 1950s, 1960s and 1970s, Polonia finished on the podium of the Polish championship six times. Its greatest successes - including the Polish vice-championship in 1976 - came under coach Bohdan Bartosiewicz, who held that position continuously from 1962 to 1976. In 1976 the Polonia women's basketball represented Poland as Vice-Champions in the Ronchetti Cup.

In 1978, the club was relegated from the highest level of the competition (then the First League) for the first time in its history. In the following years, it repeatedly made his way between the premier league and the second division. Before the 2000/2001 season, despite remaining in the first division, the team was withdrawn from the competition for financial reasons, and the section was disbanded.

Reactivation - as SKK Polonia Warsaw - took place in 2011. On April 17, 2021, the club won the First Women's Basketball League and earned the right to play in the Basket Liga Kobiet. In the first season after returning to the top league (2021/2022), Polonia advanced to the play-offs, eventually finishing a high 7th in the league. In the 2022/2023 season, the club will compete in an international competition for again in its history - the European Women's Basketball League.

Honours and titles

Polish Championships:
 1st place (2): 1934, 1935
 2nd place (4): 1933, 1937, 1949, 1975–76
 3nd place (6): 1939, 1950–51, 1955–56, 1964–65, 1966–67, 1974–75
Polish Cup: 
1st place (2): 1934, 1935
2nd place (3): 1953, 1970, 1991
LOTTO 3×3 Women's League Championship:
1st place (1): 2023
European Women's Basketball League:
3nd place (1): 2023
Polish Junior Championships:
1st place (1): 1988
2nd place (2): 1987, 1991
Polish Championship in basketball 3×3 U23:
1st place (1): 2019

Notable players 
  Edyta Czerwonka
  Katarzyna Dulnik
  Klaudia Sosnowska
  Krystyna Szymańska-Lara

Players

Current roster

References

External links
 Official Website
 Profile in eurobasket.com

Women's basketball teams in Poland
Basketball teams established in 1925
Sport in Warsaw